UTC+13:45 is an identifier for a time offset from UTC of +13:45.

As daylight saving time (Southern Hemisphere summer)
Principal settlement: Waitangi

Oceania
New Zealand – Chatham Daylight Time
Chatham Islands

See also
Chatham Standard Time Zone
Time in New Zealand

References

UTC offsets
Time in New Zealand